Henry William Gourlay (16 October 1895 – 17 August 1970) was a New Zealand cricket umpire and schoolteacher. 

Gourlay stood in one Test match, New Zealand vs. Australia, in Wellington in 1946. In all he umpired 12 first-class matches, most of them in Christchurch, between 1944 and 1950.

Gourlay was educated at Addington School and Christchurch West High School and gained a Master of Science degree at Canterbury University College. He served as a pupil-teacher at Addington School, and later compiled the school's history. He taught at Christchurch Boys' High School from 1919 to 1958. He landscaped the new grounds when the school moved to Riccarton in the 1920s. At the time of his retirement he was the school's senior biology master. 

He married Hilda Beatrice Harrison in Christchurch in December 1919. He was elected a life member of the New Zealand Rose Society in 1959. He died in Christchurch in August 1970, aged 74.

See also
 List of Test cricket umpires
 Australian cricket team in New Zealand in 1945–46

References

1895 births
1970 deaths
Sportspeople from Christchurch
People educated at Christchurch West High School
University of Canterbury alumni
New Zealand Test cricket umpires
New Zealand schoolteachers